Sumpigaster is a genus of flies in the family Tachinidae.

Species
Sumpigaster equatorialis (Townsend, 1926)
Sumpigaster subcompressa (Walker, 1853)
Sumpigaster sumatrensis Townsend, 1926

References

Tachinidae
Fauna of China
Taxa named by Pierre-Justin-Marie Macquart
Diptera of Asia